Ancylolomia inornata is a species of moth in the family Crambidae described by Otto Staudinger in 1870. It is found in Spain, Portugal and Italy, North Africa (including Morocco, Algeria, Libya and Tunisia) and Pakistan.

References

Moths described in 1870
Ancylolomia
Moths of Europe
Moths of Asia
Moths of Africa